Giuseppe Malpasso (born 1972, Lentini, Italy) is an Italian film maker. He lives and works in New York City. Malpasso has worked with Italian broadcasting networks such as RAI (the biggest television company in Italy), Mediaset, Sky Italia, LA7, and MTV (Italy). When he moved to New York he also began to work with international broadcasting networks such as: RTL, MTV, National Geographic International, TSI (Switzerland) Seven Network (Australia), and TVNZ (New Zealand). Among his works are Peppino Impastato, A Man a Doctrine (2002), Moderna (2003), Carlo Maderno - The Emergency of Baroque- (2004), Friendly Fire (2007), We Are the Future (2004), Blackout (2008), Last Stop (2009), and Pesci Rossi in New York (2009). In 2008, he covered much of the presidential campaign in America. He won a Gold Panda for the best cinematography at the Sichuan TV Festival in China for the documentary "Last Stop."

References
Official Website

Giuseppe Malpasso's Blog

External links
The Filmmaker's Intensive

1972 births
Living people
People from Lentini
Italian film directors
Film directors from New York City